The Holy Cross Crusaders men's ice hockey statistical leaders are individual statistical leaders of the Holy Cross Crusaders men's ice hockey program in various categories, including goals, assists, points, and saves. Within those areas, the lists identify single-game, single-season, and career leaders. The Crusaders represent the College of the Holy Cross in the NCAA's Atlantic Hockey.

Holy Cross began competing in intercollegiate ice hockey in 1966.  These lists are updated through the end of the 2020–21 season.

Goals

Assists

Points

Saves

References

Lists of college ice hockey statistical leaders by team
Statistical